Erik Schmidt (born 28 December 1992) is a German handball player for SC Magdeburg and the German national team.

Achievements
European Championship:
: 2016

References

1992 births
Living people
German male handball players
Sportspeople from Mainz
Handball-Bundesliga players